Luis Caballero may refer to:
Luis Caballero (comedian), comedian and writer
Luis Caballero (footballer) (born 1962), Paraguayan footballer
Luis Caballero (painter), (1943–1995),  Colombian painter
Luis Nery Caballero (born 1990), Paraguayan footballer